Ganesh Ghogra is an Indian politician from the Indian National Congress and a member of the Rajasthan Legislative Assembly. He was elected to represent the Dungarpur constituency. He is also the President Of Rajasthan Youth Congress.

References

Rajasthani politicians
Indian National Congress politicians
Indian Youth Congress
Politics of Rajasthan
Living people
1984 births
Rajasthan MLAs 2018–2023
Indian National Congress politicians from Rajasthan